Cyrenoida floridana, or the Florida marsh clam, is a species of bivalve mollusc in the family Cyrenoididae. It can be found along Gulf of Mexico coast, ranging from Georgia to southern Florida.

References

Cyrenoididae
Molluscs described in 1896